Sankt Peter in der Au is a town in the district of Amstetten in Lower Austria in Austria.

Geography
Sankt Peter an der Au lies in the west part of the Mostviertel in Lower Austria.

Sport
The local association football team is UFC Sankt Peter in der Au.

References

Cities and towns in Amstetten District